Carex alba, called the small white sedge, white-flowered sedge or just white sedge (a name it shares with other members of its genus), is a species of sedge in the family Cyperaceae. It is typically found in temperate forests of Eurasia, from the Pyrenees to the Russian Far East. It is the main host plant for the woodland brown, Lopinga achine.

References

alba
Flora of Spain
Flora of France
Flora of Central Europe
Flora of Italy
Flora of Yugoslavia
Flora of Romania
Flora of Ukraine
Flora of the Caucasus
Flora of North European Russia
Flora of South European Russia
Flora of East European Russia
Flora of West Siberia
Flora of Altai (region)
Flora of Kazakhstan
Flora of Kyrgyzstan
Flora of Xinjiang
Flora of Mongolia
Flora of Khabarovsk Krai
Plants described in 1771